The 1989 RTHK Top 10 Gold Songs Awards (Chinese: 1989年度十大中文金曲得獎) was held in 1989 for the 1988 music season.

Top 10 song awards
The top 10 songs (十大中文金曲) of 1989 are as follows.

Other awards

References
 RTHK top 10 gold song awards 1989

RTHK Top 10 Gold Songs Awards
Rthk Top 10 Gold Songs Awards, 1989
Rthk Top 10 Gold Songs Awards, 1989